Tabby's Place is a cat sanctuary situated in Ringoes, New Jersey, United States. Opened in 2003, it can house approximately 100 cats, which come primarily from high-volume public animal shelters where they have been scheduled to be killed.

History
Opened in 2003, the inception of Tabby's Place began with a stray brown tabby cat. Jonathan Rosenberg, then Chief Technology Officer at CNET, and his wife Sharon adopted this cat and named him "Tabby". The Rosenbergs lost Tabby fifteen years later to untreatable squamous cell carcinoma. In honor of Tabby, Jonathan resigned from his job, cashed in his company stock options and invested more than US$2 million to create a new 501(c)(3) non-profit corporation called Tabby's Place.  The sanctuary was established "to provide refuge to cats in hopeless situations." The sanctuary's 500th intake was documented in 2007 in the Westchester Times Tribune.

The physical therapy Tabby's Place gives to a paraplegic resident, Tashi, attracted the attention of national and local media, including Cat Channel upon Tashi's rescue in 2008, Best Friends Animal Society, ZooToo in 2008, the Courier News in 2009, the CBS Evening News with Katie Couric in 2009, and WWOR-TV.

In June 2010, a USA Today article described a United States Marine stationed in Okinawa, Japan, who had been caring for three stray cats when his local animal shelter was being shut down. The cats were scheduled to be euthanized, but the Marine requested help from the Okinawan American Animal Rescue Society, which arranged for the cats' journey from Okinawa to Tabby's Place. The transfer, which occurred in April 2010, was Tabby's Place's first international rescue.

Located in the small New Jersey town of Ringoes, Tabby's Place houses approximately 100 cats from public shelters where they have been scheduled to be killed as of 2010.  As of late 2010, over 750 Tabby's Place cats had been adopted, approximately 150 had lived out the remainder of their lives at the sanctuary, and 100 awaited adoption by qualifying families. At the time, founder Jonathan Rosenberg served as unsalaried full-time executive director and Sharon Rosenberg as volunteer coordinator at Tabby's Place.

In 2011, Tabby's Place: A Cat Sanctuary was the host of a Trap-Neuter-Return Boot Camp with the Utah-based Best Friends Animal Society.

In 2014, funds raised by a tour of the cat Lil Bub were in part donated to Tabby's Place. In June 2015, Tabby's Place held a Kitten Shower open to visitors, with a reading and book-signing by author Gwen Cooper, known for writing Homer's Odyssey about a blind cat. Around 20 kittens were available for adoption at the event. At the time, there were over 100 cats at the sanctuary. In November 2016, the sanctuary or a time lowered the adoption cost of senior cats from all cats over ten years of age from $135 to $50. At the time, a third of Tabby's Place's 120 cats were over the age of ten. Individuals contributed 97% of Tabby's Place's income in 2016.

Facility and services

Tabby's Place acts as an adoption center, and hospital and hospice for cats. Tabby's Place also provides annual open houses where pet owners can obtain microchip implants for their pets and learn from exhibitions and mini-classes in animal behavior.

Tabby's Place houses around 100 cats in a single building, and in 2010 had plans the addition of two more buildings to increase care for a total of 500 residents. The physical design of the Tabby's Place building and attention to detail has received considerable media coverage. The New Jersey Monthly described the sanctuary as "palatial." The sanctuary is cage free and constructed of materials that allow for easy and frequent cleaning. The building includes specialized suites for cats with specific medical needs, outdoor enclosures with access to sunlight, communal living areas with areas to exercise, and a medical facility in house. 
 
Focusing on serving cats scheduled for euthanasia at public shelters and rarely taking cats in from members of the public, Tabby's Place abides by a strict "no-kill" policy. Tabby's Place does not restrict the admission of cats on the basis of age or medical conditions, or being generally considered "unadoptable" by the standards of most public animal shelters.
 
Tabby's Place houses many "special needs" cats, adopting a philosophy that even cats with serious health conditions such as diabetes, Feline immunodeficiency virus (FIV), neurological disabilities, cancer, blindness and paraplegia should be able to live with dignity, to have a loving home, and to be adopted. Families who are unable to adopt are offered the option of sponsoring or "virtually" adopting a cat.

Media coverage
Tabby's Place cats and personnel are frequently seen in YouTube video shorts and the facility and its residents have been included in programming on Animal Planet's series Cats 101.

As of 2016, NewJersey.com had on ongoing "Cat of the Week at Tabby's Place" column ongoing in the community bulletin of the paper.

Recognition
The Rosenbergs' work has been recognized by the New Jersey Veterinary Medical Association, which awarded Jonathan the 2005 New Jersey Veterinary Foundation Award, and the Supreme Master Ching Hai International Association awarded Jonathan and Sharon the Shining World Hero Award in 2009.

Most recently, the "SuperCats" of Tabby's Place were collectively nominated by the sanctuary's volunteers and won the New Jersey Veterinary Medical Association's 2011 Animal Hall of Fame Award.

References

External links
Tabby's Place
Cat Town Cafe

Animal welfare organizations based in the United States
Companies based in Hunterdon County, New Jersey
Domestic cat welfare organizations
East Amwell Township, New Jersey